This is a list of California ballot propositions from 2010-2019.

Elections

June 8, 2010 primary

November 2, 2010 general election

June 5, 2012 primary
In October 2011, Governor Jerry Brown signed into law a bill which requires all future ballot initiatives to be listed only in general elections (held in November), rather than during any statewide election. The two initiative propositions below qualified for the next statewide election (which was the June 2012 presidential primaries) prior to the signing of the law.

November 6, 2012 general election

June 3, 2014  primary 
As per the aforementioned 2011 law, only mandatory propositions sent from the state legislature may appear on the June primary ballot.

November 4, 2014 general election

June 7, 2016 primary election
As per the aforementioned 2011 law, only mandatory propositions sent from the state legislature may appear on the June primary ballot.

November 8, 2016 general election
The number of propositions in this election was significantly larger than previous elections. The increase has been attributed to the relatively low number of signatures required for ballot placement for this election.  The number of signatures required for ballot placement is a percentage of the turnout in the previous election. Since the turnout in the November 2014 elections was low, the number of signatures required for ballot placement in 2016 was 365,880, whereas the typical requirement is well over half a million signatures.

June 5, 2018 primary 
As per the aforementioned 2011 law, only mandatory propositions sent from the state legislature may appear on the June primary ballot.

November 6, 2018 general election
The filing fee for submitting a proposition to the ballot has been raised by a factor of 10, from $200 to $2,000, following the signing of a law in September 2015. Originally lawmakers wanted to raise the fee to $8,000 but compromised on $2,000. The fee is refunded if the proposition makes it to the ballot. The fee increase was in response to a proposition calling for "the execution of gays and lesbians" that was circulated for the 2016 election but did not make the ballot. During debate lawmakers were concerned that the fee increase may "discourage legitimate initiatives by average citizens".

References

2010
Ballot propositions
21st century in law
Ballot propositions, 2010